Sun TV Network is an Indian mass media company headquartered in Chennai, Tamil Nadu, India. It is a part of Sun Group and is one of Asia's largest TV networks. Established on 14 April 1992 by Kalanithi Maran, it owns a variety of television channels in multiple languages and radio stations in multiple languages. Its flagship channel is Sun TV.

Owned channels

On air channels 
SUN TV Network currently owns and operates 33 TV channels (25 SD + 8HD) across Indian languages – Tamil, Telugu, Malayalam, Kannada, Marathi and Bengali.

Defunct channels

Film production
Sun Pictures is a film production and distribution company established in 2000. It is a part of Sun TV Network. It has produced the TV film Siragugal and Rajnikanth starrer Endhiran. It has distributed more than 20 Tamil films starting from Kadhalil Vizhunthen, and now Producing many big budget movies.

Television production company
Sun Entertainment is television production company, which produces small budget movies for Sun TV Direct TV Premier, after movie released in TV it will available only on Sun NXT OTT App, also will be co-producing upcoming webseries for the Sun NXT OTT Platform and this dept also co-produced the daily soaps which are to be telecasted in their channels.

OTT Platform 

Sun NXT is a global online audio/video streaming (over-the-top) platform owned and operated by Sun TV Network. Has more than 4000 movie titles and more than 450 TV shows. Sun TV network usually takes the movies digital rights of the ones which are telecasted in its TV channels.

See also 
 Sun Group
Sun Pictures
 Sun Kudumbam Awards
 Sunrisers Hyderabad
Sun Direct
Red FM, Suryan FM

References 

Sun Group
1993 establishments in Tamil Nadu
Television networks in India
Television stations in Chennai
Television channels and stations established in 1993
Indian Premier League franchise owners
Companies listed on the National Stock Exchange of India
Companies listed on the Bombay Stock Exchange
Television broadcasting companies of India
Mass media companies of India
Broadcasting